Trapene Parish is an administrative unit of Smiltene Municipality, Latvia.

Towns, villages and settlements of Trapene Parish 
 Līzespasts
 Ādams
 Rūpnieki

References

Parishes of Latvia
Smiltene Municipality